Bojan Accetto (4 September 1922 in Ljubljana – 26 July 2007) was a Slovenian physician, the founder of gerontology in Slovenia. He was a professor of internal medicine nd of social gerontology at the Faculty of Social Sciences in Ljubljana. He established the institute for gerontology and geriatry. He explored the solidification of blood and thrombosis. He wrote "Starost in staranje" (Age and Ageing) - 1986. For his efforts, he received the Kidrič prize in 1958. His son, Rok Accetto, is a Slovenian cardiologist.

References
 Slovenski veliki leksikon, Mladinska knjiga (2003)

1922 births
2007 deaths
Slovenian geriatricians
Academic staff of the University of Ljubljana
Place of death missing
Gerontologists
People from Ljubljana in health professions
Yugoslav physicians